Endophthora rubiginella is a species of moth in the family Tineidae. It was described by George Vernon Hudson in 1939. This species is endemic to New Zealand.

References

Moths described in 1939
Tineidae
Moths of New Zealand
Endemic fauna of New Zealand
Taxa named by George Hudson
Endemic moths of New Zealand